Csepreg (German: Schapring; Croatian: Čepreg) is a town in Vas County, Hungary. It is the largest town on the Répce River. The current mayor of the town is Zoltán Horváth, elected on November 13, 2019.

Although tourism, particularly camping and fishing, are important sources of income for the town, a plan for the establishment of a metal finishing factory was accepted by the council after the first plan had been rejected.

Education 

 The town has a nursery, a kindergarten, an elementary school, a music school and a secondary school( Nádasdy Tamás Economic and IT Secondary School).
 The town library has a significant collection.

Notable people 
Miklós Takács de Saár, silviculturist, politician
Antalovits Ferenc was born in Csepreg in 1953. He is a double European Championship bronze medalist and a four-time World Championship bronze medalist weight-lifter.

Sport 
The football club of Csepreg was founded in 1924. The biggest achievement was winning the First Division of Vas County in the season of 1996/97. Currently the team is in the First Division of Vas County in the season of 2019/20, led by the coach, Zsolt Steiner.

Twin towns—sister cities
Csepreg is twinned with:

  Delnice, Croatia

Gallery

References

External links 
Street map 

Populated places in Vas County